Moenkhausia lepidura is a species of characin found in the Amazon and Orinoco River basins. This species can reach the average length of 9 cm (3.5 in).

References

Characidae
Fish of South America
Taxa named by Rudolf Kner
Fish described in 1858